In differential calculus, there is no single uniform notation for differentiation. Instead, various notations for the derivative of a function or variable have been proposed by various mathematicians. The usefulness of each notation varies with the context, and it is sometimes advantageous to use more than one notation in a given context. The most common notations for differentiation (and its opposite operation, the antidifferentiation or indefinite integration) are listed below.

Leibniz's notation 

The original notation employed by Gottfried Leibniz is used throughout mathematics. Leibniz's notation makes this relationship explicit by writing the derivative as

Higher derivatives are written as

This is a suggestive notational device that comes from formal manipulations of symbols, as in,

.

Leibniz's notation allows one to specify the variable for differentiation (in the denominator). This is especially helpful when considering partial derivatives.  It also makes the chain rule easy to remember and recognize:

 

Leibniz treated these symbols as infinitesimals. Later authors have assigned them other meanings, such as infinitesimals in non-standard analysis or exterior derivatives.

Some authors and journals set the differential symbol  in roman type instead of italic: . The ISO/IEC 80000 scientific style guide recommends this style.

Leibniz's notation for antidifferentiation 

Leibniz introduced the integral symbol  in Analyseos tetragonisticae pars secunda and Methodi tangentium inversae exempla (both from 1675).  It is now the standard symbol for integration.

Lagrange's notation 

One of the most common modern notations for differentiation is named after Joseph Louis Lagrange, even though it was actually invented by Euler and just popularized by the former.  In Lagrange's notation, a prime mark denotes a derivative.  If f is a function, then its derivative evaluated at x is written
.
It first appeared in print in 1749.

The use of repeated prime marks eventually becomes unwieldy. Some authors continue by employing Roman numerals, usually in lower case, as in

to denote fourth, fifth, sixth, and higher order derivatives.  Other authors use Arabic numerals in parentheses, as in

This notation also makes it possible to describe the nth derivative, where n is a variable.  This is written

Unicode characters related to Lagrange's notation include
 
 
 
 

When there are two independent variables for a function f(x, y), the following convention may be followed:

Lagrange's notation for antidifferentiation 

When taking the antiderivative, Lagrange followed Leibniz's notation:

However, because integration is the inverse operation of differentiation, Lagrange's notation for higher order derivatives extends to integrals as well.  Repeated integrals of f may be written as
 for the first integral (this is easily confused with the inverse function ),
 for the second integral,
 for the third integral, and
 for the nth integral.

Euler's notation 

When applied to a function , it is defined by

Higher derivatives are notated as "powers" of D (where the superscripts denote iterated composition of D), as in
 for the second derivative,
 for the third derivative, and
 for the nth derivative.

Euler's notation leaves implicit the variable with respect to which differentiation is being done.  However, this variable can also be notated explicitly.  When f is a function of a variable x, this is done by writing
 for the first derivative,
 for the second derivative,
 for the third derivative, and
 for the nth derivative.
When f is a function of several variables, it's common to use "∂", a stylized cursive lower-case d, rather than "". As above, the subscripts denote the derivatives that are being taken. For example, the second partial derivatives of a function  are:

See .

Euler's notation is useful for stating and solving linear differential equations, as it simplifies presentation of the differential equation, which can make seeing the essential elements of the problem easier.

Euler's notation for antidifferentiation 

Euler's notation can be used for antidifferentiation in the same way that Lagrange's notation is as follows
 for a first antiderivative,
 for a second antiderivative, and
 for an nth antiderivative.

Newton's notation

Isaac Newton's notation for differentiation (also called the dot notation, fluxions, or sometimes, crudely, the flyspeck notation for differentiation) places a dot over the dependent variable.  That is, if y is a function of t, then the derivative of y with respect to t is

Higher derivatives are represented using multiple dots, as in

Newton extended this idea quite far:

Unicode characters related to Newton's notation include:
 
 
  ← replaced by "combining diaeresis" + "combining dot above".
  ← replaced by "combining diaeresis" twice.
 
 
 
 
 

Newton's notation is generally used when the independent variable denotes time.  If location  is a function of t, then  denotes velocity and  denotes acceleration. This notation is popular in physics and mathematical physics.  It also appears in areas of mathematics connected with physics such as differential equations.

When taking the derivative of a dependent variable y = f(x), an alternative notation exists:

Newton developed the following partial differential operators using side-dots on a curved X ( ⵋ ). Definitions given by Whiteside are below:

Newton's notation for integration 

Newton developed many different notations for integration in his Quadratura curvarum (1704) and later works: he wrote a small vertical bar or prime above the dependent variable, a prefixing rectangle, or the inclosure of the term in a rectangle to denote the fluent or time integral (absement).

 

To denote multiple integrals, Newton used two small vertical bars or primes, or a combination of previous symbols  , to denote the second time integral (absity).

 

Higher order time integrals were as follows:
 

This mathematical notation did not become widespread because of printing difficulties and the Leibniz–Newton calculus controversy.

Partial derivatives 

When more specific types of differentiation are necessary, such as in multivariate calculus or tensor analysis, other notations are common.

For a function f of an independent variable x, we can express the derivative using subscripts of the independent variable:

 

This type of notation is especially useful for taking partial derivatives of a function of several variables.

Partial derivatives are generally distinguished from ordinary derivatives by replacing the differential operator d with a "∂" symbol.

What makes this distinction important is that a non-partial derivative such as  may, depending on the context, be interpreted as a rate of change in  relative to  when all variables are allowed to vary simultaneously, whereas with a partial derivative such as  it is explicit that only one variable should vary.

Other notations can be found in various subfields of mathematics, physics, and engineering; see for example the Maxwell relations of thermodynamics. The symbol  is the derivative of the temperature T with respect to the volume V while keeping constant the entropy (subscript) S, while  is the derivative of the temperature with respect to the volume while keeping constant the pressure P. This becomes necessary in situations where the number of variables exceeds the degrees of freedom, so that one has to choose which other variables are to be kept fixed.

Higher-order partial derivatives with respect to one variable are expressed as

and so on. Mixed partial derivatives can be expressed as

In this last case the variables are written in inverse order between the two notations, explained as follows:

So-called multi-index notation is used in situations when the above notation becomes cumbersome or insufficiently expressive.

 

In this way some results (such as the Leibniz rule) that are tedious to write in other ways can be expressed succinctly -- some examples can be found in the article on multi-indices.

Notation in vector calculus 

Vector calculus concerns differentiation and integration of vector or scalar fields.  Several notations specific to the case of three-dimensional Euclidean space are common.

Assume that  is a given Cartesian coordinate system, that A is a vector field with components , and that  is a scalar field.

The differential operator introduced by William Rowan Hamilton, written ∇ and called del or nabla, is symbolically defined in the form of a vector,

where the terminology symbolically reflects that the operator ∇ will also be treated as an ordinary vector.

 Gradient: The gradient  of the scalar field  is a vector, which is symbolically expressed by the multiplication of ∇ and scalar field ,

 Divergence: The divergence  of the vector field A is a scalar, which is symbolically expressed by the dot product of ∇ and the vector A,

 

 Laplacian: The Laplacian  of the scalar field  is a scalar, which is symbolically expressed by the scalar multiplication of ∇2 and the scalar field φ,

 

 

Many symbolic operations of derivatives can be generalized in a straightforward manner by the gradient operator in Cartesian coordinates. For example, the single-variable product rule has a direct analogue in the multiplication of scalar fields by applying the gradient operator, as in

Many other rules from single variable calculus have vector calculus analogues for the gradient, divergence, curl, and Laplacian.

Further notations have been developed for more exotic types of spaces.

See also

 
 
 
 
 
 
 Operational calculus

References

External links
 Earliest Uses of Symbols of Calculus, maintained by Jeff Miller.

Differential calculus
Mathematical notation